MusicMogul.com was an online music world targeting aspiring musicians. They hoped to combine the popularity of social-networking sites, music television shows like "American Idol" and online multiplayer games.

History
Founded in 2008, Music Mogul was the product of a collaboration between professionals from the gaming and music industries: CEO Nicholas Longano, a video game industry veteran; Chief Creative Officer & Music Supervisor Rodney Jerkins, a Grammy  – winning music producer; Chief Talent Operations Ray Brown, formerly with Ribeiro & Brown Management, Nu Life Entertainment and Southern Boy Entertainment.

Music Mogul Features

Competition
Registered users uploaded videos or linked YouTube videos to their profile.  These videos were auditions for the Music Mogul Competition.  Other users can vote on each video a maximum of one time on a scale of 1 to 10.  Musicians are rated both on their points and their average rating.

Performers were to be selected by their online peers and an industry panel of judges to win a three-song demo deal with Rodney Jerkins’ Darkchild Productions.

One live competition was hosted in Los Angeles in August 2009, and was won by Nashville-based singer/songwriter Suzi Oravec.

The site appears to be defunct as of 2010.

References

American music websites
Defunct social networking services